New Mexico State Road 14 (NM 14) is an approximately  state road located in northern New Mexico. The highway connects Albuquerque to Santa Fe and comprises most of the Turquoise Trail, a National Scenic Byway which also includes NM 536 (Sandia Crest Scenic Byway).

Route description
NM 14 begins at the intersection with NM 333 in Tijeras, which is also the center of the Tijeras interchange along Interstate 40 (I-40). NM 14 heads north through Bernalillo County, passing through the community of Cedar Crest, to San Antonito, where it intersects NM 536.

The highway continues northeast and briefly cuts through Sandoval County by entering from the south and leaving from the east. Now in Santa Fe County, NM 14 turns to the north. It intersects NM 344 west of Oro Quay Peak, both of which are located south of the ghost town of Golden.

History

State Road 10 (NM 10) had been established before 1927 between Albuquerque and Santa Fe. By 1927, part of NM 10 was replaced by US 470 from Tijeras to Albuquerque, but the northern terminus remained at US 85 in Santa Fe. By 1930, the end of NM 10 was at US 66. In 1935, NM 10 was extended south to NM 15 near Tajique. NM 15 was later absorbed into a further southern extension of NM 10 to US 54 in Carrizozo. By 1949, this highway was mostly paved.

Originally, the NM 14 designation was serviced by a road between the Arizona–New Mexico state line and US 80 in Road Forks. NM 14 along with SR 86 in Arizona provided a shortcut to US 80 between Benson, Arizona and Road Forks, due to US 80 taking a loop to Douglas, Arizona. The original NM 14 was replaced by Interstate 10 in 1960.

In 1970, the NM 14 designation was recycled and used to re-number NM 10, to avoid numbering confusion with I-10. During the 1988 re-numbering, NM 14 was extended along former US 85 through Santa Fe to US 84 and US 285, while the concurrency with NM 333 was eliminated. The sections of NM 14 south of NM 333 were renumbered NM 337 and NM 55 respectively.

Major intersections

See also

References

External links 

New Mexico State Highways

014
Transportation in Bernalillo County, New Mexico
Transportation in Sandoval County, New Mexico
Transportation in Santa Fe County, New Mexico
New Mexico Scenic and Historic Byways
National Forest Scenic Byways